Chris Geddes (born 15 October 1975) is the keyboardist for and a founding member of the Scottish indie pop band Belle & Sebastian. Born in Stroud, England, he is a vegetarian, the latter earning him the nickname of "Beans". He attended the University of Glasgow.
Geddes has been described as a communist.

References

1975 births
Living people
Belle and Sebastian members
English keyboardists
British indie pop musicians
People from Stroud
People from Dalry, North Ayrshire
Alumni of the University of Glasgow